Johnathon Lee Bronson (born July 8, 1982) is a former American football tight end for the Arizona Cardinals of the National Football League (NFL). He played college football at Penn State.

High school
Bronson was a four-year letterman in football at Kent-Meridian High School in Kent, Washington. He was a first-team all-conference tight end and defensive end in his senior year there. Bronson finished his career with 48 receptions for 472 yards and two touchdowns Bronson had  80 tackles with 10 sacks and one interception as a senior. Bronson also excelled at track and field, leading Kent-Meridian to four undefeated dual meet seasons. He finished 7th in the state in the shot put and helped his 4x100 relay team place 6th in the state.

College
Bronson moved from defensive end to tight end prior to his senior season at Penn State University, and he caught 4 passes for 16 yards and one touchdown. As a junior, he played in 10 games, starting 4 at defensive end finishing the season with 26 tackles and two sacks for the Nittany Lions. Bronson started 11 games at defensive end as a sophomore and had 57 tackles and 4½ sacks. He played in the first 8 games as a redshirt freshman, recording 9 tackles.

He earned a Bachelor of Arts in journalism from Penn State in 2004.

Professional football career
Bronson signed with the Arizona Cardinals as an undrafted rookie free agent in 2005. He made the opening day 53-man roster but suffered a knee injury in the season opener at the New York Giants on September 11, 2005 and spent the remainder of the year on injured reserve. Bronson did record two special teams tackles in that game. The Cardinals released him on August 27, 2007, at the end of the 2007 preseason.

Later career and personal life
After his stint in the NFL, Bronson had a series of transitioning ventures including travel, real estate, and personal training companies. Bronson is the Managing Director of Finger Licking Dutch, a stroopwafel company that produces caramel waffle cookies from The Netherlands. He runs this business with his current life partner Femke Veelenturf, who is Dutch. He was also the founder and Chief Sports Mentor of Sporment, an online mentoring organization in which children are assisted by former professional sportspeople. In 2013, Bronson shifted his focus to start PACC Pro Network (formerly known as the Pro Athlete Chamber of Commerce) and hold an executive role at John Bronson Marketing. He was married to Dawn Root Bronson, who died in April 2016 of kidney cancer.

Johnson has two brothers, who also play in the NFL: Demitrius Bronson played for the Seattle Seahawks, and Josiah Bronson with the Dallas Cowboys (traded from the New Orleans Saints).

References

1982 births
Living people
American football tight ends
Arizona Cardinals players
Penn State Nittany Lions football players
Sportspeople from Kent, Washington
Donald P. Bellisario College of Communications alumni